Peoria Rivermen is the name of four minor league hockey clubs:

Peoria Rivermen (IHL), named as such 1984–1996, formerly the Peoria Prancers 1982–1984
Peoria Rivermen (ECHL), 1996–2005
Peoria Rivermen (AHL), 2005–2013
Peoria Rivermen (SPHL), 2013–present